The Cricket World Cup is a One Day International (ODI) competition in men's cricket. Organised by the International Cricket Council (ICC), the tournament has taken place every four years since it was first held in Cricket World Cup in England. The number of teams and number of matches have increased since then, although the ICC declared an interest in reducing the format, following criticism of the 2007 World Cup.

India batsman Sachin Tendulkar holds an array of individual records in the World Cup. One of the Wisden Cricketers of the Year in 1997, and "the most followed cricketer in the world", Tendulkar has made more scores over fifty and scored more runs than any other cricketer in World Cup history. Australia's Glenn McGrath dominates the individual bowling records, having featured for his country in four World Cups. He has one of the best strike rate and economy rate among any other bowler, having the best individual bowling figures and taken more wickets in the history of the tournament.

Australian Ricky Ponting and Sri Lankan Kumar Sangakkara lead the individual fielding records. Ponting is the leading fielder in terms of catches taken, in both an individual World Cup tournament and in the competition's history, while Sangakkara has the most dismissals by a wicketkeeper in World Cup history. Adam Gilchrist holds joint records for the most dismissals by a wicketkeeper in both a single match (along with Sarfraz Ahmed) and in an individual tournament (along with Tom Latham). Australia hold several team records, including those for the most wins, the highest win percentage, the most consecutive wins; they were undefeated in the 2003 and 2007 Cricket World Cup campaigns.

Records are also kept of unsuccessful performances. These include Canada's lowest score in the history of the tournament, Zimbabwe's record number of matches lost and Canadian Nicholas De Groot's three consecutive ducks.

Notation
Team notation
 (300–3) indicates that a team scored 300 runs for three wickets and the innings was closed, either due to a successful run chase or if no overs remained (or are able) to be bowled.
 (300) indicates that a team scored 300 runs and was all out, either by losing all ten wickets or by having one or more batsmen unable to bat and losing the remaining wickets.

Batting notation
 (100) indicates that a batsman scored 100 runs and was out.
 (100*) indicates that a batsman scored 100 runs and was not out.

Bowling notation
 (5–100) indicates that a bowler has captured five wickets while giving away 100 runs.

Currently playing
 Record holders who are currently playing ODIs or streaks that are still active and can change have a ^ next to their name.

Team records

Team wins, losses, ties, and no results

Result records

Greatest win margin (by runs)

Lowest win margin (by runs) 
As well as these narrow victories, there have been five matches where the scores finished level, including the 2019 Final, which England eventually won on the number of boundaries scored.

Team scoring records

Highest innings totals

Lowest innings totals

Highest match aggregate

Lowest match aggregate

Highest run chase 

Note: In the 2011 Cricket World Cup, England scored 338–8 in the second innings to tie their game against India.

King of tournament

Streaks

Batting

Most career runs

Highest individual scores

Highest average

Highest strike rate

Most centuries

Most 50+ scores

Fastest 50

Fastest 100

Overall

Sachin Tendulkar holds numerous batting records, including those for the most centuries, most fifties and most runs. He also has the most Man of the Match awards.

One tournament

Streaks

Bowling

Most career wickets

Best bowling figures

Best average

Best strike-rate

Best economy rate

Overall

Glenn McGrath holds the records for the most wickets and best bowling figures. Lasith Malinga was the first player to take four wickets in four balls at international level, against South Africa at the 2007 World Cup. Chaminda Vaas took four wickets in five balls against Bangladesh in 2003, including wickets with the first three balls of the match. There have also been hat tricks in Cricket World Cups by Chetan Sharma, Saqlain Mushtaq, Brett Lee, Kemar Roach, Steven Finn, JP Duminy and Mohammed Shami. Lasith Malinga was the first bowler to take 2 hat-tricks in Cricket World Cup matches.

One tournament

Fielding
While records for best fielders have varied through different World Cups, the records for wicketkeepers have been occupied by Kumar Sangakkara who holds the record for most dismissals overall and Adam Gilchrist which holds the record for most dismissals by a wicketkeeper in one tournament and in one match.

Most dismissals (wicketkeeper)

Most catches (fielder)

One tournament

One match

Other records

There are certain records other than batting, bowling or fielding. These records include participation records, hosting records etc.

Extras
An extra is a run scored by a means other than a batsman hitting the ball. Other than runs scored off the bat from a no-ball, a batsman is not given credit for extras and the extras are tallied separately on the scorecard and count only towards the team's score.

Grounds
The World Cup has been held in England five times. As a result, English grounds have hosted the most World Cup matches.

Umpires

Most Matches

Most finals as umpire

Appearances

Tournaments

Most Matches
The top 10 list is dominated by players who have appeared in five World Cup tournaments.

Representing more than one country

Most World Cup Titles

Age
A total of 40 players aged 19 years old or under have made an appearance in the World Cup and 19 players aged more than 40 have played in the competition.

Captaincy

Most matches as a captain

Best win% as a captain (min. 10 matches)

See also

List of One Day International cricket records
List of Cricket World Cup Centuries
List of ICC Men's T20 World Cup records

References

External links
 List of Cricket World Cup records from CricketArchive 
 List of Cricket World Cup Records from cricket-records.com

World Cup
Records
World Cup Records
Records